He Was Called Holy Ghost is a 1971 Italian Spaghetti Western-comedy film written and directed by Roberto Mauri and starring Vassili Karis. It was followed by Return of the Holy Ghost (1972), still directed by Mauri and with Karis in the title role.

Plot

Cast 

 Vassili Karis as  Holy Ghost 
 Mimmo Palmara as  Sheriff 
  Margaret Rose Keil as  Consuela  
 Jack Betts as  Foster (credited as Hunt Powers) 
 Jolanda Modio  as  Squaw 
 José Torres as  Steve 
  Lina Franchi as Holy Ghost's Mother

References

External links

Spaghetti Western films
1971 Western (genre) films
1971 films
Films directed by Roberto Mauri
1970s Italian films
1970s Italian-language films